Carbonel is a children's book series by Barbara Sleigh, first published by Puffin Books from 1955 to 1978. Also published in the US by Bobbs-Merrill from 1955. It has three novels, first Carbonel: the King of the Cats and two sequels, The Kingdom of Carbonel (Puffin, 1961) and Carbonel and Calidor: Being the Further Adventures of a Royal Cat (Kestrel Books, 1978), and was based on the old British folk tale "The King of the Cats". The first edition of Carbonel was illustrated by V. H. Drummond, that of Kingdom by D. M. Leonard, and that of Carbonel and Calidor by Charles Front. Carbonel was named a Book of the Month by Young Elizabethan magazine, as a "most sensible, it-could-easily-have-happened fairy story".

Plot
The plot concerns a girl named Rosemary who buys a broom and a cat from an untidy woman in the marketplace. When the cat starts talking to her she learns that she has encountered a witch, selling up to start a new career. Moreover the cat, Carbonel, just happens to be King of the Cats, presumed missing by his subjects ever since the witch Mrs. Cantrip abducted him. Unfortunately he cannot return to his throne until the enslavement spell Mrs. Cantrip cast on him is undone, and so Rosemary, together with her friend John, have to learn a little witchcraft and track down Mrs. Cantrip for her, at best ambivalent help.

The first two books are more closely linked than the third. Carbonel has been said to have few real cat characteristics: he is more like Edith Nesbit's Psammead in Five Children and It (1902), speaking "with the voice of tart and faintly impatient adulthood".

Cats (albeit non-speaking ones) are also central to Sleigh's stand-alone novel No One Must Know (1962), about children hiding a cat and her kittens from a landlord who has banned pets.

Another novel of Sleigh's suitable for the age group is The Snowball (1969).

Books
Carbonel: the King of the Cats,  (Puffin paperback)
The Kingdom of Carbonel,  (Bobbs-Merrill hardback)
Carbonel and Calidor,  (Kestrel Books hardback)

References

External links

British children's novels
Series of children's books
Novels about cats
Novels by Barbara Sleigh